Frederic Cecil Hunter (23 August 1886 – 21 July 1926)  was an English cricketer who played first-class cricket for  Derbyshire from 1905 to 1907

Hunter was born at  Glossop, Derbyshire. He made his debut for Derbyshire in the 1905 season against Essex in June when he made 27 in his first innings and took a wicket.  He made his top score of 51 against Sussex in the 1906 season and played his last match in the 1907 season.

Hunter was a right-hand batsman and played 49 innings in 28 first-class matches with an average of 12.26 and a top score of 51. He was a leg-break bowler and took 17 first-class wickets for an average of 40.23 and a best performance of 2 for 18.

Between 1910 and 1912 Hunter played minor county cricket for Cheshire

Hunter died at  Adelaide, South Australia at the age of 39.

References

1886 births
1926 deaths
Derbyshire cricketers
English cricketers
Cheshire cricketers